David Cabrera may refer to:

David Cabrera (Salvadoran footballer) (born 1945), Salvadoran football forward
David Cabrera (Mexican footballer) (born 1989), Mexican football midfielder
David Cabrera (Colombian footballer) (born 1995), Colombian football midfielder

See also
Cabrera (disambiguation)